Osmium tetrabromide is the inorganic compound with the formula OsBr4. A black solid, this compound can be produced by heating osmium tetrachloride and bromine under pressure.

Structure
As determined by X-ray crystallography, osmium tetrabromide is an inorganic polymer. It is isomorphous with platinum tetrabromide and technetium tetrachloride.  As such, osmium is in octahedral coordination. Each osmium center bonds to four doubly bridging bromide ligands and two mutually cis terminal bromide ligands.

Related compounds
OsBr3 is the only other binary osmium bromide is that has been crystallized.

References

Bromides
Platinum group halides